Lom-et-Djerem is a department of East Province in Cameroon. The department covers an area of 26,345 km and as of 2001 had a total population of 228,691. The capital of the department lies at Bertoua.

Subdivisions
The department is divided administratively into 8 communes and in turn into villages.

Communes 
 Bélabo
 Bertoua 
 Bétaré-Oya
 Diang
 Garoua-Boulaï
 Mandjou
 Ngoura

References

Departments of Cameroon
East Region (Cameroon)